Dovray is a city in Murray County, Minnesota, United States.  The population was 57 at the 2010 census.

Geography

Minnesota State Highway 30 and Murray County Road 42 are the main routes in the community.  County Road 11 is also in the immediate area.

The city of Dovray is located within section 20 of Dovray Township geographically but is a separate entity.

Demographics

2010 census
As of the census of 2010, there were 57 people, 31 households, and 16 families residing in the city. The racial makeup of the city was 98.2% White and 1.8% from two or more races. Hispanic or Latino of any race were 1.8% of the population.

There were 31 households, of which 9.7% had children under the age of 18 living with them, 45.2% were married couples living together, 3.2% had a female householder with no husband present, 3.2% had a male householder with no wife present, and 48.4% were non-families. 32.3% of all households were made up of individuals, and 22.6% had someone living alone who was 65 years of age or older. The average household size was 1.84 and the average family size was 2.31.

The median age in the city was 59.5 years. 5.3% of residents were under the age of 18; 3.6% were between the ages of 18 and 24; 22.9% were from 25 to 44; 36.9% were from 45 to 64; and 31.6% were 65 years of age or older. The gender makeup of the city was 43.9% male and 56.1% female.

2000 census
As of the census of 2000, there were 67 people, 33 households, and 23 families residing in the city. The racial makeup of the city was 95.52% White, and 4.48% from two or more races.

There were 33 households, out of which 18.2% had children under the age of 18 living with them, 60.6% were married couples living together, 3.0% had a female householder with no husband present, and 30.3% were non-families. 24.2% of all households were made up of individuals, and 15.2% had someone living alone who was 65 years of age or older. The average household size was 2.03 and the average family size was 2.35.

In the city, the population was spread out, with 13.4% under the age of 18, 7.5% from 18 to 24, 14.9% from 25 to 44, 28.4% from 45 to 64, and 35.8% who were 65 years of age or older. The median age was 54 years. For every 100 females, there were 81.1 males. For every 100 females age 18 and over, there were 81.3 males.

The median income for a household in the city was $37,500, and the median income for a family was $41,875. Males had a median income of $32,188 versus $16,875 for females. The per capita income for the city was $17,461. There were no families and 13.1% of the population living below the poverty line, including no under eighteens and 11.8% of those over 64.

History
Dovray was platted in 1904, and named from its location in Dovray Township.

Politics
Dovray is located in Minnesota's 7th congressional district, represented by Collin Peterson, a Democrat. At the state level, Dovray is located in Senate District 22, represented by Republican Doug Magnus, and in House District 22A, represented by Republican Joe Schomacker.

Notes

Cities in Minnesota
Cities in Murray County, Minnesota